Fuga is a 2006 Chilean-Argentine drama film directed by Pablo Larraín. It is Larraín's directing debut.

Plot 
The story revolves around Eliseo Montalbán (Benjamín Vicuña), who as a child witnesses his sister's rape and murder on a piano while a musical piece is incidentally composed. This event causes him to grow up as a prodigy in music with an obsessive and disturbed personality, especially with the musical piece, which he later believes carries the death. Eventually, Eliseo composes a Rhapsody, his masterpiece. But when it is premiered, his love interest, the pianist Georgina (Francisca Imboden), dies moments after beginning to perform it in front of a packed Santiago Municipal Theater. This causes intense mental torment, and his father locks him up in a mental institution, where Eliseo falls into clandestinity and obscurity.

As a tormented Eliseo remains in hiding after escaping the mental institution, Ricardo Coppa (Gastón Pauls) and a group of musicians try to recover Montalbán's musical piece and make it their own, without realizing they are in danger.

Cast 
 Benjamín Vicuña as Eliseo Montalbán
 Gastón Pauls as Ricardo Coppa
 Francisca Imboden as Georgina
 María Izquierdo as Madre de Eliseo
 Willy Semler as Padre de Eliseo
 Héctor Noguera as Klaus Roth
 Alfredo Castro as Claudio
 Alejandro Trejo as Pacian
 Paulina Urrutia as Macarena

References

External links 

2006 drama films
2006 directorial debut films
2006 films
Chilean drama films
Argentine drama films
Films about composers
2000s Argentine films
Argentine musical films
Chilean musical films